Robert Manuel may refer to:
Robert Manuel (veteran) (born 1935), Korean War veteran
Robert Manuel (politician) (born 1953), Haitian political figure
Rob Manuel (born 1973), co-founder of B3ta
Bobby Manuel (born 1945), American guitarist
Robert Manuel (baseball) (born 1983), American baseball player
Robert Manuel (actor) (1916–1995), French actor and film director